is a Japanese former swimmer who competed in the 1984 Summer Olympics and in the 1988 Summer Olympics. She represented her country at the age of twelve.

See also
Akita Prefectural General Pool

References

1968 births
Living people
Japanese female breaststroke swimmers
Olympic swimmers of Japan
Swimmers at the 1984 Summer Olympics
Swimmers at the 1988 Summer Olympics
Asian Games medalists in swimming
Swimmers at the 1982 Asian Games
Swimmers at the 1986 Asian Games
Asian Games gold medalists for Japan
Asian Games silver medalists for Japan
Medalists at the 1982 Asian Games
Medalists at the 1986 Asian Games
People from Akita (city)
20th-century Japanese women